Lesbian, gay, bisexual, and transgender (LGBT) persons in Ghana face legal and societal challenges and discrimination not experienced by non-LGBT citizens.

Same-sex sexual acts have been illegal in Ghana since the colonial era.  LGBT rights are heavily suppressed. The majority of Ghana's population hold anti-LGBT sentiments. Physical and violent homophobic attacks against LGBT people are common, and are often encouraged by the media and religious and political leaders. At times, government officials, such as police, engage in such acts of violence. Reports of young gay people being kicked out of their homes are also common, as well as reports of conversion therapy occurring across Ghana.

Despite the Constitution guaranteeing a right to freedom of speech, expression and assembly to Ghanaian citizens, these fundamental rights are actively denied to LGBT people. Pro-LGBT activism exists in Ghana, but such efforts are often thwarted by the Ghanaian government. However in 2016, Ghana's attitudes towards homosexuality are slowly evolving and becoming more tolerant and accepting of LGBT rights. However this truce was broken in 2021. In February, religious and political leaders forced an LGBT centre to close in Accra. Then in May,   police arrested 21 people attending a human rights workshop in Ho city, Volta region. And in August, lawmakers proposed a bill (still under review) so extreme that simply saying you are gay or lesbian could land you in mandatory conversion therapy or prison for up to 10 years.  .

History 
In the 18th and 19th century Asante courts, male slaves served as concubines. They dressed as women and were killed when their master died.

The Nzema people had a tradition of adult men marrying each other, usually with a 10-year age difference. These marriage were called , "friendship marriages". The couple would observe all the social equivalents of heterosexual marriage, a bride price was paid and a traditional wedding ceremony was held. Among the Nankani, female marriages were observed for the continuous perpetuation of the lineage. Rose Mary Amenga-Etego states that these non-sexual woman to woman marriages were "the last desperate religio-cultural practice employed to reclaim and reinstate the male genealogical descent structure of the people".

The Fante people would believe that those, of either sex, with "heavy souls" were attracted to women, whereas those with "light souls" were attracted to men.

Homosexuality in Ghana was criminalised in 1892. During this time, Ghana was a British colony. The Offences against the Person Act of 1861, a British law which criminalized sodomy, was implemented in all British colonies.

Legal status 
Section 104 of the Ghanaian Criminal Code of 1960 criminalises consensual same-sex sexual acts between persons of the same gender. Under Section 104(1)(b), "unnatural carnal knowledge" with consent is considered a misdemeanour. Under other subsections of Section 104, rape and bestiality are also criminalised. Additionally, Section 104(2) defines "unnatural carnal knowledge" as "sexual intercourse with a person in an unnatural manner or with an animal." Under Article 296(4) of the Criminal Procedural Code, a misdemeanour shall be liable to imprisonment for a term not exceeding three years.

By the early 21st century, these laws from 1960 were rarely enforced. However, while the law may not lead to prosecutions before local courts, persecution of LGBT people is nevertheless widespread and common.

Application to women
In 2013, a local lawyer, John Ndebugri challenged views on the illegality of lesbianism under Ghanaian law. According to him, lesbianism, which is also homosexuality, does not involve penetration with a penis and therefore cannot be described as sexual intercourse or unnatural, based on section 104 of the Criminal Code. He added: "females don't have [sic] penis. They cannot penetrate," in a story published by MyJoyOnline.

Application to heterosexuals
The law also applies to straight people who have anal or oral sex. Though the state "does not concern itself with this" because it is their private life, causing allegations of hypocrisy.

Recognition of same-sex relationships
Ghana does not recognise same-sex marriage or same-sex civil unions.

Adoption and parenting
A single person may able to adopt a child if that person is a citizen of Ghana, except that a single male may adopt only if the child to be adopted is his biological child. Same-sex couples are not allowed to adopt children.

Discrimination protections
Section 12(2) of Chapter 5 of the Constitution of Ghana provides that, "Every person in Ghana, whatever his race, place of origin, political opinion, colour, religion, creed or gender shall be entitled to the fundamental human rights and freedoms of the individual contained in this Chapter but subject to respect for the rights and freedoms of others and for the public interest."

Although there is no law against discrimination based on sexual orientation or gender identity, any person in Ghana who believes he/she has experienced discrimination on the basis of HIV status, gender identity or sexual orientation may report an incident through the Commission for Human Rights and Administrative Justice (CHRAJ) stigma and discrimination reporting portal.

In 2013, the United States offered to help Ghana develop legislation to protect the rights of LGBT persons.

Living conditions 
LGBT-identifying Ghanaians face a lot of discriminations in Ghanaian society. At the Accra International Airport, a sign states, "Ghana does not welcome pedophiles and sexual deviants." While not explicitly referencing the LGBT community, Ghanaians associate sexual deviance with the LGBT community.

According to a 19 August 2004 Afrol News report, Prince MacDonald‚ the leader of the organisation for gays, lesbians, bisexuals, and transsexuals in Ghana, commented that "there are lots and lots of people in our prison home who have been caught by this unfriendly law". He said that the "police beat and punish people who are found to be gays".

On 21 July 2011, Paul Evans Aidoo, the Western Region Minister, ordered all gay people in the west of the country to be rounded up and arrested and called on landlords and tenants to inform on people they suspected of being gay. Statements made by public leaders and officials have impact, and are often followed with violent acts towards the LGBT community.

Pearl, a 30-year old lesbian woman from Ghana, shares that Ghanaians take action into their own hands when dealing with the LGBT community. Pearl shares that in September 2009, she was taken to a conference room in her village, amongst 50 other villagers. In this room, Pearl was repeatedly asked if she was lesbian, and when she stated that she was not, village members beat her. Amongst these villagers was a young boy who wanted to burn her alive.

Pearl's story is shared by other LGBT Ghanaians. It is viewed as shameful and as a disgrace for people to have family members that identify as LGBT. Emelia, a thirty-year-old woman, shared that when her father discovered that she was lesbian, he beat her with his fists and a broken beer bottle. Similarly, Agnes, a 26-year-old, shared that when her father discovered her sexuality, he chased her out of her house with a machete, and threatened to murder her if she returned. The type of violence LGBT-identifying peoples face in Ghana is found not only in community settings, but also in familiar settings, such as one's family.

Violent mob attacks directed against LGBT people are common in Ghana. In 2012, a birthday party was violently interrupted by a mob, who claimed the party was a same-sex wedding. The police refused to arrest the attackers, and arrested some of the victims. In 2013, a gay man was subject to a manhunt, after Muslim officials threatened to burn or bury him alive because he was gay. In 2015, a group of lesbian women were "shit-bombed" and "pelted with stones" because they were gay.

On top of facing violence within their communities and homes, there are anti-gay vigilante groups that actively aim at discovering LGBT identifying peoples in their communities. A 10-person vigilante group had been monitoring a man, Ebenezer Okang, and one night visited his home to beat him, with the intentions of burning him alive. When asked if he had reported the event, Okang shared that it is difficult to seek protection in such situations, given Ghana’s anti-LGBT laws and the police attitudes. According to Human Rights Watch, discrimination towards LGBT individuals is common in public and private, making it difficult for them to seek help.

In a rare incident in April 2017, police in Accra arrested two men who had blackmailed, extorted and abused a gay man, and who had threatened to post nude pictures of him. The police arrested the men and cooperated with the victim in finding them. Erasing 76 Crimes, an LGBT website, labeled the arrest a "rare exception" as police seldom intervene to protect LGBT people from violence, discrimination, and abuse.

Reports emerged in August 2018 of conversion therapy programmes run by religious leaders to "cure" LGBT people of their homosexuality. There is no reliable evidence that sexual orientation can be changed, and medical bodies warn that conversion therapy practices are ineffective and potentially harmful.

Police action
Ghana's police force sometimes protects members of the LGBT community. For example, in the town of Tamale, they aided gay men who were being blackmailed. On the other hand, police violence against LGBT-identifying individuals has been documented. One woman reported that, not only did her community members beat her when they discovered her sexuality, but she was also kicked in her mouth by a police officer.

Ghana's anti-gay laws may legally require the police to persecute LGBT citizens. In 2016, a lesbian couple, accused of having a wedding, was arrested by the police. Some LGBT groups, such as the Solace Initiative, provide LGBT citizens with human rights trained paralegals who can help defend them in court.

2021 Arrests

On May 20, 2021, Ghanaian police in Ho, in the Volta region, assisted by security forces, raided and unlawfully arrested 21 people, including a technician, during a paralegal training workshop about how to document and report human rights violations against LGBT people.  They were detained for 22 days, then released on bail, and charged with unlawful assembly, a misdemeanor. The case was later dismissed for lack of evidence of a crime.

The activists said that eight police officers, accompanied by three journalists, forced their way into the conference room, physically assaulted some participants,

Human rights reports
The U.S. Department of State's 2011 Human Rights Report found that,
LGBT persons face  widespread discrimination [in 2010], as well as police harassment and extortion attempts. Gay men in prison were often subjected to sexual and other physical abuse. In June 2010[,] more than 1,000 protesters in Takoradi, Western Region, participated in a peaceful rally against reports of gay and lesbian activities in their city. This was reportedly the first of  such protest in the country. In May 2010[,] an HIV/AIDS training workshop was held in Takoradi for health- care workers. After the workshop, The Daily Graphic announced that 8,000 gay persons had been "registered" in the Western and Central Regions. However, experts in the field denied that there had been any such "registration". After the workshop[,] there was significant negative reporting in the media about homosexuality. In a June 2010 interview with The Daily Graphic, the Western Region minister called on the government to take steps to combat homosexuality. He included the possibility of police raids on locales frequented by gay men and lesbians, efforts by community leaders to "wean young people" away from homosexuality, and a public condemnation by the government. However, no arrests of persons were made in connection with his comments by year's end, and he did not repeat his call. It was reported that four men who worked within the community of gay men were arrested in May 2010 in connection with an alleged sexual assault and were later charged with sodomy. The case was first brought to the Takoradi Circuit Court on 24 August; however, it had not been heard by year's end.

The U.S. Department of State's 2012 Human Rights Report found that,
LGBT persons faced widespread discrimination, as well as police harassment and extortion attempts. Gay men in prison were often subjected to sexual and other physical abuse. In March a gang of men assaulted nine people they believed to be LGBT individuals in Jamestown, a neighborhood of Accra, forcing them from their homes and attacking them with canes and sticks. The victims filed a complaint with a legal human rights organization. They said their homes were burgled while they were chased out. No arrests had been made in the case by year's end. In May a peer educator employed by an NGO to instruct sexual health education workshops was assaulted by a group of boys at a school in the Volta Region. The assault occurred after they discovered he was carrying safe-sex presentation materials such as condoms, wooden sex organ replicas, lubricant, and pamphlets. The peer educator was detained by police but later released. The boys were not charged.The United Nations Rapporteur's 2018 Human Rights Report found that,While Ghana is meeting democracy and development goals, a quarter of the population lives in poverty with LGBT-identifying individuals being most subjected to this type of poverty. Given their sexual orientation, it is difficult for them to find jobs. Additionally, since many families disown their LGBT family members, this can leave them homeless. The rapporteur recommended that Ghana repeal its legislation on adult consensual same-sexual activities, and that the government launch a public campaign to educate on the rights and legal and social services of those who are victims of sexual discrimination.

United Nations recommendations
The United Nations Human Rights Committee in October 2012 completed a Universal Periodic Review of the human rights situation in Ghana. The following recommendations were made to Ghana (the countries that initiated the recommendation are listed in brackets):

 Decriminalize same-sex relations between consenting adults (France, Slovenia and the Czech Republic)
 Promote tolerance about same-sex relations (Czech Republic) and combat homophobia (Slovenia and Belgium)
 Combat violence, stigmatization, and discrimination towards persons based on their sexual orientation (Portugal)
 Eliminate the crime of "unnatural sexual relations" and adopt measures to eradicate discrimination motivated by sexual orientation and gender identity (Spain)
 Ensure that the constitutional guarantee of equality and dignity are applied to LGBT persons. Ensure thorough and impartial investigation into all allegations of attacks and threats against individuals targeted because of their sexual orientation or gender identity (Norway)
 Consider which recommendations of the High Commissioner on sexual orientation and gender identity can be taken into account in the further detailing of government policies (Netherlands)
 Train police, first responders, the justice system, and social services officials to respect and fully protect the human rights of LGBT persons (United States)

Ghana rejected all of these recommendations.

Public opinion
According to a 2017 poll carried out by ILGA, 60% of Ghanaians agreed that gay, lesbian and bisexual people should enjoy the same rights as straight people, while 30% disagreed. Additionally, 59% agreed that they should be protected from workplace discrimination. 51% of Ghanaians, however, said that people who are in same-sex relationships should be charged as criminals, while 34% disagreed. As for transgender people, 64% agreed that they should have the same rights, 62% believed they should be protected from employment discrimination and 55% believed they should be allowed to change their legal gender.

According to the Afro-barometer, Ghana places amongst the twenty least tolerable countries. When asked if they would care if they were neighbors to homosexual(s), only 11% of Ghana’s population reported that they would be fine with this. The continental average for African countries is 21%, so this places Ghana as nearly two times more intolerant towards homosexuals than the rest of the continent.

When compared to other minority groups, such as people of a different ethnicity, different religion, foreign workers, or people infected with HIV/AIDS, Ghanaian citizens still reported having the most unfavorable feelings towards those who identify as a part of the LGBT community. With 89% of Ghanaians sharing that they strongly/somewhat dislike LGBT individuals, this makes them the most disliked group in the country of Ghana. Additionally, when examined as to who is being polled, all different demographics—those of a different age, education, religion, living style (rural or urban,) gender—reported having a dislike towards homosexuals of 80% or more. However, when individuals are more in contact with those of an LGBT identity, they are prone to be more tolerant.

The Director of Interfaith Diversity Network of West Africa (IDNOWA), Davis Mac-Iyalla has said in a public hearing for the far reaching Anti-LGBT bill proposed in Ghana that the passing of the Anti-LGBTQI bill into law will codify the spirit of mob action, violence and vigilantism that exist in many parts of the country.

Nearly 90% of Ghanaians shared that they would report a daughter, relative, friend, or co-worker to the police if they knew that they were engaging in such behavior. Additionally, 86% of Ghanaians stated they would support legislation to criminalize those who are in same-sex relationships.

Comments by public officials
Religious leaders and government officials view LGBT rights and advocacy as a new manifestation of Western colonialism. Religious leaders have used passages from the Bible, Leviticus 18:22 and Leviticus 20:13, to justify why they condemn homosexuality.

While serving as president of Ghana, the late John Evans Atta Mills vowed in 2011 not to legalise homosexuality despite UK Prime Minister David Cameron's threat to cut aid to Ghana because of its record on human rights for its gay population. In February 2017, Speaker of the Parliament Aaron Mike Oquaye called for amending the laws of Ghana to ban homosexuality entirely.

In November 2017, President Nana Akufo-Addo suggested that the legalisation of homosexuality in Ghana is inevitable and said he can foresee a change in the law. Akufo-Addo, who grew up in England, said that LGBT rights will evolve in Ghana as they have in the United Kingdom, but affirmed that LGBT rights were not part of the government agenda at the moment. In response, LGBT activists announced they would hold a peaceful march in Accra in December.

In August 2018, President Akufo-Addo stated that the Government of Ghana would not legalise same-sex marriage or decriminalise homosexuality.

Many public officials from government and church organizations are publicly against the LGBT community. In March 2020, the National Women's Organizer of the National Democratic Congress shared that homosexuals should be killed. Many pastors speak out against the LGBT community, such as Kofi Tawiah, Head Pastor of the Osu Church of Christ, who called on Ghanaian Christians to violently attack LGBT people. In his statement, Tawiah also stated that homosexuality should be treated with capital punishment.

The 2018 Human Rights Watch report noted that these types of comments made by government and public officials embolden homophobic acts of violence and discrimination towards the LGBT community.

Activism
LGBT activism had largely been anonymous in Ghana. However, in the year 1998, a young man named Cobbina MacDarling, who uses the pseudonym Prince Kweku MacDonald, became one of its voices. Prince works with the Gay and Lesbian Association of Ghana (GALAG) which was later transformed into a human rights organization known as the Centre for Popular Education and Human Rights (CEPEHRG). In recent years, there have been several grassroot LGBT groups which have come together to form a bigger movement under the name Coalition Against Homophobia, Transphobia and Biphobia in Ghana. These groups operate underground. There are a few LGBT groups in Ghana, most of whom operate secretly online. One such group is FOTHA-Ghana (Friends of the Heart Alliance - Ghana). Members of the group operate through the dark web. To be seen supporting the views and interest of gays, lesbians and bisexuals can easily result in the attack or probable lynching of its members. 
One of the groups that is public in its advocacy efforts is the Gay and Lesbian Association of Ghana (GLAG). Some of their work involves demystifying issues with the HIV/AIDS crisis. Despite Ghana having a low infection rate, the government's public campaign efforts on this health crisis typically present it as an issue for straight individuals. Most gay men acknowledged that they understood that HIV can be transmitted sexually, but they were unaware that it can be transmitted through anal sex as well. Ghana receives funding to combat HIV/AIDS, but they discount the health risk presented for LGBT individuals. The Gay and Lesbian Association of Ghana, along with other LGBT advocacy groups, counteract the government's misinformation by specifically addressing it to the LGBT community, and by distributing and teaching of the usefulness of condoms and lube in preventing infection. In January 2021, LGBT+ Rights Ghana, a Pro-LGBT rights organization opened its office in Accra amidst opposition from anti-LGBT rights groups. The office was raided and closed by National Security in late February 2021 due to opposition from locals, religions institutions, and politicians.

An issue with many activist groups is that their work is directly thwarted by the government. In September 2006, the BBC reported that the Ghanaian Government had banned an LGBT rights conference that was alleged to be taking place on September 4 at the Accra International Conference Centre. Minister of Information and National Origin Kwamena Bartels said, "The government does not condone any such activity which violently offends the culture, morality[,] and heritage of the entire people of Ghana."

In March 2020, a historic conference was to be held in Accra. The Pan Africa ILGA was aiming to hold its first conference in West Africa to develop strategies to improve LGBT rights, increase awareness of LGBT issues, and to protect queer youth in Africa. After Ghana faced backlash from religious organizations, President Nana Akufo-Addo banned the event, citing that it would be considered illegal for such an event to be held in Ghana, since they legally condemn and criminalize same-sex acts amongst adults.

In June 2022, Ghanaian LGBT rights activists filed lawsuits against the government for the government's current stance on LGBT rights and over allegations of abuse.

Anti-activism 
LGBT advocacy efforts are often opposed and made illegal by the government, but anti-LGBT groups are embraced. In October 2019, the World Congress of Families, a US-based anti-LGBT group, held a conference in Accra, during which they encouraged Africans to adopt the practice of conversion therapy. These types of conferences are not the only types of anti-LGBT sentiments being shared and embraced in Ghana. It is also documented that vigilante groups go after the LGBT community in Ghana. Such groups spy, blackmail, and plan attacks on LGBT citizens, or those they suspect to be LGBT. Safety Empire is one of these vigilante groups, and in August 2015, they beat a young man they suspected to be gay in a town near the capital.

On an international front, many external entities, such as the United Nations and other individual countries, speak in favor of LGBT rights. Groups that are pro-LGBT rights view these international statements unfavorably, since they are often viewed as statements that do not support their advocacy or efforts, and only reignite the hate and discrimination towards LGBT individuals. An example of this is former President Atta Mills vowing to never legalize homosexuality when urged by the United Kingdom. This brought the issue of homosexuality back to a national front, but not in a favorable position.

2021 Anti-LGBTQ Bill 
A few months after the opening of the center, and the backlash from both the government and citizens that followed, a draft for a new bill was leaked on the internet in July 2021. It is formally known as the Promotion of Proper Human Sexual Rights and Ghanaian Family Values Bill.

Under this bill, public displays of same-sex affection and crossdressing would be punished with jail, it would be illegal to form LGBTQ organizations or to disseminate information perceived as supporting LGBTQ people or rights, certain kinds of healthcare would be banned, and "conversion therapy" could be mandated. It would be illegal even to identify as LGBTQ, and advocacy for LGBTQ rights could result in 5–10 years in prison. Same-sex marriage and adoption by same-sex couples would also, unsurprisingly, be banned.

The memorandum of the bill claims that Ghana, its government, the majority of its citizens, its culture, and history completely disapprove of the LGBTQ community. The bill was presented before parliament in early August 2021. Ghana's parliament is scheduled to reopen in late October 2021, after which a vote may be held.

The Presbyterian Church of Ghana have been very vocal about their support for the new proposed Anti-LGBTQ+ bill that is currently before the Parliament of Ghana.

Summary table

See also 

Human rights in Ghana
LGBT rights in Africa

References

External links
 

LGBT in Ghana
Ghana
Law of Ghana
Politics of Ghana
Discrimination in Ghana
Human rights in Ghana